Beshbarmak (Kazakh – Қазақша ет, етқамыр, 'five-finger') is a dish from Central Asian cuisine. It is also known as naryn in Xinjiang, Uzbekistan, Kyrgyzstan and Kazakhstan, as turama or dograma in Karakalpakstan, North Caucasus and Turkmenistan, as kullama in Bashkortostan and Tatarstan. It one of the main national dishes of both Kyrgyzstan and Kazakhstan.

The term beshbarmak means "five fingers" because nomads traditionally eat this dish with their hands. Another name for beshbarmak in Kyrgyz is 'tuuralgan et', which means crumbled/chopped meat. Beshbarmak is usually made from finely chopped boiled meat, mixed with dough (typically egg noodles) and chyk, an onion sauce. It is typically served on large communal platters, shared between several people, after shorpo, which is a first course of mutton broth served in bowls called kese. It is also followed by a broth called ak-serke (shorpo mixed with kymyz or ayran), which is thought to help with settling the stomach. Festive beshbarmak can be cooked together with kazy and chuchuk.

Historical background
The cuisine of Central Asia developed within the constraints of a nomadic life, when people were completely reliant on their animals. This is reflected in Central Asian dishes, which are rich in meat and dairy products.

The construction of beshbarmak as a national dish dates to the Soviet literature having inherited the nomadic and "settler" dichotomy from the Russian Empire. Two books were foundational in the formation of the national cuisines of Central Asian peoples: Kniga o vkusnoi i zdorovoi pishche (The Book of Tasty and Healthy Food) and Natsional’nyie kukhni nashikh narodov (National cuisines of our peoples).

The serving ritual
The serving of beshbarmak is steeped in ritual. If an animal, such as a sheep, was slaughtered in a guest's honor, then the host serves ustukan, different cuts of meat, to different people, depending on their gender, age, and rank in the social structure. As a sign of respect, the oldest people and honored guests are always presented the prime cuts of the meat.

On special occasions, the guest of honor, the eldest male, or the youngest male, receives the bash, the head of the animal, and cuts pieces from it to distribute to other people. The oldest men or aksakal receives the jambash, the thigh-bone. The oldest and most respected women receive the kuiruk or kuymulchak, the tailbone. The legs and shoulders are presented to the younger adults, and the smaller bones are reserved for the daughter-in-law of the house. The omurtka, the spine, is given to the children.

Other ustukans include the joto jïlïk, tibia or shin-bone, the kashka jïlïk, thigh or femur bone, the bone from rib to thigh called the karchiga, a rib without fat called the kara kabirga, the kar jïlïk or radius bone, dalii or shoulder blade, the toshi, breast or brisket, and the kung jïlïk, bone from the leg to the shoulder blade.

Preparation

In the classic variant of beshbarmak, as it is now prepared in northern Kyrgyzstan (especially in the Naryn region), a good, sharp knife called maki  is required, to thinly dice all the ingredients before they are put on the dastarkhan. The dish also requires a pot to boil the meat and noodles in, and a rolling pin to roll out the noodles, also the use of a fork with five tines on it to help with the tradition.

Beshbarmak is prepared by first boiling a piece of meat, such as the rump of a horse, or a rack of lamb, or kazy or chuchuk horsemeat sausage. In warm seasons, beshbarmak is usually made with mutton.

The noodle dough is made from flour, water, eggs, and salt, and rested for 40 minutes. Then the dough is rolled out very thinly, and cut into noodles.

References

External links
 Besh barmak 

Bashkir cuisine
Kazakhstani cuisine
Kyrgyz cuisine
Turkmenistan cuisine
Uyghur cuisine
Uzbek dishes
Soviet cuisine
Tatar cuisine
National dishes
Lamb dishes
Mixed noodles
Communal eating